Marek Gniewkowski (born 30 June 1965) is a Polish fencer. He competed in the sabre events at the 1988 and 1992 Summer Olympics.

References

1965 births
Living people
Polish male fencers
Olympic fencers of Poland
Fencers at the 1988 Summer Olympics
Fencers at the 1992 Summer Olympics
Fencers from Warsaw